Diya, previously known as Karu, is a 2018 Indian horror film directed by A. L. Vijay and produced by Lyca Productions. The film is shot simultaneously in Tamil and Telugu languages, the latter titled as Kanam. It stars Sai Pallavi, Naga Shourya, and Veronika Arora. The music was composed by Sam CS, with editing done by Anthony and cinematography by Nirav Shah. Both the Tamil and Telugu versions were released on 27 April 2018.

Plot
The plot revolves around Thulasi (Sai Pallavi) and Krishna (Naga Shourya). Thulasi gets pregnant because of Krishna at the age of 19, but their family decides to abort the child. After five years, they get married, but Thulasi is not very happy because of their past. Later, Krishna explains to let go of the past, and soon, she comes out of the pain and starts leading a happy life.

The truth that is happening around Thulasi and Krishna is that their little unborn girl Diya (Veronika Arora) has always been with them all along invisibly. When Krishna's father (Nizhalgal Ravi) comes to meet Krishna at his new flat, Diya sees him and starts following him to his house. The next day, he is found dead in the water tank of their building. This is Diya's plan for revenge. Later, when Thulasi's mother (Rekha) comes to visit Krishna's father's funeral, Diya starts following her and kills her in an elevator in Krishna's construction site. As the death case is handled by Sub-Inspector Raghavan (RJ Balaji  (in Tamil)) / SI Agni (Priyadarshi (in Telugu)), he comes to the conclusion that both of them are dead due to asphyxiation.

When Krishna and Thulasi visit the hospital, they meet a doctor (Sujitha), who also happens to die in a car accident because of Diya. There rises a suspicion within the investigating team that whoever meets Thulasi and Krishna are dying due to the same reason. The police also found it suspicious that the doctor's car had child lock on when there was actually no child in the car. One day, Thulasi's uncle (Jayakumar J) comes to visit her. Thulasi looks at her family picture and suddenly realizes that the deaths surrounding them are happening for the same reason:when she was pregnant with Diya, she was forced by her mother, father-in-law, uncle, the doctor, and Krishna to abort the child. Realizing that her uncle may be the next to be killed, Thulasi calls him, but it is too late as a huge container falls on him, killing him. Thulasi thinks that Diya is with her and calls out her name, to which she responds by making the carousel doll move, making Thulasi realize that all the deaths are indeed because of her. She tries to tell this to Krishna and insists that she has to be with him always so that Diya will not kill him, but he does not believe these stories and takes her to a psychiatrist.

One day, Krishna gets a call from the construction site and leaves without telling Thulasi. She panics and calls him, but he hangs up. When she reaches his site, she saves him just in time from a crane carrying a huge block that was about to hit him. Krishna still does not believe in Thulasi's suspicions and at a priest's suggestion to have a Pooja, they make arrangements, but Thulasi dreams about those people burning Diya and she is suffering in pain, so she sends the priests away. Meanwhile, Krishna meets the psychiatrist, who suggests that Krishna go somewhere alone and switch off his phone for two days, and Thulasi will finally stop panicking once he returns safe and sound.

The next day, Krishna is gone, and Thulasi is worried and keeps searching for him. Diya takes this opportunity and tries to kill Krishna by making the walls of his room close in on each other to crush him to death. Meanwhile, Agni/Raghavan thinks that whatever Thulasi says is true and goes in search of her, but he finds that she met with an accident and is unconscious, so he takes her to the hospital, where they try to revive her heart. Thulasi's spirit sees Diya and stops her from killing Krishna. Krishna understands that Thulasi was right. The doctors are able to successfully revive Thulasi, and tears roll from her eyes and she is happy that she finally met Diya. The doctor then says that Thulasi is pregnant.

The movie ends with a message about abortion.

Cast

Production
In early April 2017, A. L. Vijay announced that he would be working on a film starring Sai Pallavi for Lyca Productions and that he would direct a script he had written "three and a half years ago". He had chosen to cast Sai Pallavi, after another project for Pramod Films, which would have been a Tamil remake of the Malayalam film Charlie (2015) with Madhavan, was suddenly shelved. After securing the actress's dates to shoot the film, Vijay finalised the technical crew to include his regular collaborators such as cinematographer Nirav Shah and editor Anthony. For Sai Pallavi, it became her first Tamil language film following a series of projects which she dropped out of, she was replaced in or was shelved. She had previously been cast and then replaced in Mani Ratnam's Kaatru Veliyidai (2017), while she opted out Vijay Chander's Sketch (2017). Likewise, earlier, her films Charlie and Rajiv Menon's Saravam Thaala Maayam were indefinitely postponed. The following month, Telugu actor Naga Shourya, was signed on to make his debut in Tamil films. Sam C.S. was roped as music director, working with Vijay for the first time replacing his usual music director, G. V. Prakash Kumar.

The film was revealed to be completed by September 2017, with Sai Pallavi beginning her dubbing work. Vijay denied that the film was a horror film and stated that the film would explore the "story of a young mother and her four-year-old child", with Sai Pallavi portraying the mother. Still, the film is a horror story with Baby Veronika as the aborted daughter of Naga Shouraya and Sai Pallavi, who takes revenge on the demise of her.

In April 2018, the film's title was changed from Karu to Diya.

Release
This movie was released on April 27, 2018. The satellite rights of the film were sold to Zee Tamil.

Soundtrack
 
The music is composed by Sam CS and all lyrics are by Madhan Karky.

Critical reception

Ashameera Aiyappan of The Indian Express wasn't impressed with the story of the film and said that, "The story is predictable. There isn't much surprise beyond the first few minutes until the very end." but praised the music composer Sam CS and the lead actress Sai Pallavi about whom the critic said that Sai Pallavi, "makes a strong debut in Tamil with an incredibly subtle and measured performance." The critic gave the film a rating of 2.5 out of 5. Priyanka Sundar of Hindustan Times gave the film a rating of 1.5 out of 5 and said that, "Sai Pallavi's stunning performance cannot save this confusing film." Kirubhakar Purushothaman of India Today gave the film a rating of 1.5 out of 5 saying that, "Director Vijay's recently released film comes across as a half-baked, confusing at times, bothering take on the whole issue of abortion." M Suganth of The Times of India praised the acting performance of Sai Pallavi, cinematography by Nirav Shah and music by Sam CS but wasn't impressed with the film and said that, "despite these strengths, Diya isn't compelling enough." The critic gave the film a rating of 3 out of 5.

Regarding Kanam, The Times of India stated that "One would expect 'Kanam' to be nothing less than a thriller that will keep you guessing and at the edge of your seat. However, it fails to live up to that expectation".

References

External links

2018 films
2010s Tamil-language films
2018 horror thriller films
Films about abortion
Films directed by A. L. Vijay
Films scored by Sam C. S.
Indian pregnancy films
Indian horror thriller films